Daniel Sappa (born 9 February 1995, La Plata) is an Argentine footballer who plays as a goalkeeper for Palestino on loan from Estudiantes.

References

External links
 
 
 

1995 births
Living people
Argentine footballers
Argentine expatriate footballers
Argentine people of Italian descent
Association football goalkeepers
Estudiantes de La Plata footballers
Arsenal de Sarandí footballers
Club Atlético Patronato footballers
Club Atlético Belgrano footballers
Club Deportivo Palestino footballers
Argentine Primera División players
Chilean Primera División players
Argentine expatriate sportspeople in Chile
Expatriate footballers in Chile